Rutu Landscape Conservation Area is a nature park which is located in Viljandi County, Estonia.

The area of the nature park is 329 ha.

The protected area was founded in 1990 to protect Rutu Hill (:et) and its surrounding areas. In 2001, the protected area was designated to the landscape conservation area.

References

Nature reserves in Estonia
Geography of Viljandi County